Hampus Söderström (born 7 November 2000) is a Swedish professional footballer who plays for Sollentuna.

References

External links 
 

2000 births
Living people
Swedish footballers
Swedish expatriate footballers
Expatriate footballers in Belarus
Swedish expatriate sportspeople in Belarus
Association football defenders
Hammarby Fotboll players
IK Frej players
FC Rukh Brest players
Ettan Fotboll players
Sollentuna FK players